Hillclimbing is a motorsport

Hillclimbing may also refer to:

Hillclimbing (cycling)
Hillclimbing (railway)
Hill climbing, an optimization algorithm in mathematics

See also
Hillwalking
Mountaineering
Hilcrhyme, a Japanese hip-hop duo
Newport Antique Auto Hill Climb, a racing event in Newport, Indiana
Hill Climb Racing (video game), video game